Nasht-e Rud (also Romanized as Nasht-e Rūd and Nashest Rūd) is a village in Adaran Rural District, Asara District, Karaj County, Alborz Province, Iran. At the 2006 census, its population was 91, in 25 families.

References 

Populated places in Karaj County